Jim Irving Mooney (September 4, 1906 – April 27, 1979) was a Major League Baseball player who played pitcher from - for the St. Louis Cardinals and New York Giants.

External links

1906 births
1979 deaths
Major League Baseball pitchers
Baseball players from Tennessee
East Tennessee State Buccaneers baseball coaches
East Tennessee State Buccaneers baseball players
St. Louis Cardinals players
New York Giants (NL) players
People from Johnson City, Tennessee
People from Hawkins County, Tennessee